Bucco is a genus of birds.

Bucco may also refer to:

 Fritz Bucco, Swiss footballer in the early 1920s
 Senator Bucco (disambiguation)
 Anthony M. Bucco (born 1962), American politician
 Anthony R. Bucco (1938–2019), American politician
 Bucco Bruce, a derogatory nickname for the Tampa Bay Buccaneers
 Buccos, a nickname for the Pittsburgh Pirates baseball team
 the surname of several characters in the television series The Sopranos

See also
 Osso buco, a veal dish that originated in Lombardy, Italy
 Bucca (disambiguation)
 Bucko (disambiguation)